Fort Nonsense is an historical park in Mathews County, Virginia, United States. Historical markers on site say it was built using slave labor by Confederate forces during the Civil War to help protect Richmond from the threat of Union forces landing from ships. However, Union forces that kept control of Gloucester, Virginia which is located northwest of the fort (so between Richmond and the fort), were the only troops to threaten the fort's area. Since Gloucester-based Union troops could attack the fort's rear and since the fort's defenses pointed in the wrong direction, the site came to be called locally "Fort Nonsense." The local historical society, the county, and the state's department of transportation share responsibility for the park —which has trails among traces of earthworks and some interpretive signage.

References

Unincorporated communities in Mathews County, Virginia
Unincorporated communities in Virginia